UAAP Season 57 is the 1994–95 athletic year of the University Athletic Association of the Philippines, which was hosted by the National University.

The season opened on July 16, 1994 at the Araneta Coliseum. Only seven teams showed up as Adamson University was under a one-year ban because of the Marlou Aquino academic controversy.

Basketball

Men's basketball

Elimination round

Playoffs

References